"Bear Down" is the official motto of the University of Arizona (U of A), located in Tucson, Arizona.  It is the inspiration for "Bear Down, Arizona!," the unofficial fight song of the school's Arizona Wildcats. The official fight song is "Fight! Wildcats! Fight!" written by Douglas Holsclaw.

History
John B. Salmon (Button Salmon) was the student body president, as well as the starting quarterback for the Wildcat football team and the catcher for the Wildcat baseball team, and member of Sigma Nu fraternity and Chain Gang Junior Honorary.

The day after the first game of the 1926 football season, Salmon and two others were involved in an automobile accident, in which their vehicle flipped over in a ravine. Although Salmon's friends were not injured, Salmon suffered a severe spinal cord injury.  In the aftermath of the accident, football coach Pop McKale visited him in the hospital every day. During McKale's last visit, Salmon's last message to his teammates was, "Tell them.. tell the team to bear down." John Salmon died on October 18, 1926. Following Salmon's funeral, McKale reportedly told the team what he had said in a Las Cruces, N.M., locker room before a football game against the Aggies of New Mexico State, and U of A won a hard-fought victory, 7-0.

The following year, the University of Arizona student body adopted the slogan for use with all Wildcat athletic teams. That year, the Chain Gang, a junior honorary organization at the UA, held a dance in the newly constructed university gymnasium to raise funds to paint the slogan on the roof of the building at coordinates . The words are still featured on the roof of the gymnasium, now known as Bear Down Gym. In 1939, the Arizona state legislature issued a decree that "Bear Down" would be the exclusive property of The University of Arizona. Research at the State Archives does not find any record of such a decree:
archives@azlibrary.gov :  I'm not sure where those citations originated, but I don't believe we have official documentation here at the state archives giving exclusive rights to the University for the phrase "Bear Down." I was initially a bit dubious about this citation due to the verbiage referring to a "decree" issued by the Arizona Legislature - the legislature does not actually issue decrees, so I checked some alternate sources. I had one of our agency's law librarian check the session laws to see if this was put through as a bill - no luck. I checked Memorials and Resolutions, which is probably the closest we would have to something called a decree, and found nothing. Finally, I even checked in the Governor's records to see if this was issued as a proclamation, and found nothing. 

Doing a bit of googling, I see that this "decree" is mentioned several times, but no one provides any substantive evidence of such a thing existing. My suggestion to you is that you may want to spend a bit of time searching through newspapers to see if you can find information about an event happening in 1939 recognizing the phrase. Could it have, rather than the legislature, been the Arizona Board of Regents? Or a different governing body? Might it be a different kind of document altogether? Unfortunately, we do not have the staff to do this kind of research, but you are welcome to visit us to look at reels of microfilm or borrow them through Interlibrary Loan. You may also want to contact the University of Arizona Special Collections to see if they can clarify this reference, if you haven't already. 

In 2013 Arizona's football stadium installed a new artificial surface with "Bear Down" etched in the center of the field and running from end to end between the 15-yard lines. Previously the phrase was painted on the field in two separate areas. Before the 2022 season, the artificial surface was renovated and "Bear Down" returned to the painted sideline alongside each 20-yard line.

Fight song
The song "Bear Down, Arizona!" was written by Jack K. Lee, the university's future band director, in 1952. As related by Lee himself in later years, Lee was one of several applicants for the position of Director of Bands at the U of A. During his visit to the university for his job interview, he was given a tour of the campus and was told the story of the Bear Down slogan. As his flight home to Michigan left from the Tucson airport, it banked over the university campus, and Lee saw the slogan painted on the roof of the university gymnasium. He was struck by inspiration, took an airsickness bag from the seat pocket of the plane and wrote, in pencil, the lyrics to "Bear Down, Arizona." Lee was offered the band director job. The song was publicly performed in September 1952 for the first time by U of A band at a pep rally in downtown Tucson. A replica of the original manuscript, created by Lee on a paper sack, is displayed in the Alumni Heritage Lounge on the main floor of the Student Union Memorial Center on the university campus.

Lyrics

Although the following coda is not actually a part of the song, the band (along with the crowd) sometimes chants it immediately after they have played "Bear Down".  Part of the chant originates in a 1988 rap song about the Arizona basketball team, written by Harvey Mason, Jr.

The verse of the song is rarely sung. At most athletic events, the chorus is sung twice, followed by the chant.

References 

Mottos
Pac-12 Conference fight songs
American college songs
Arizona Wildcats